Westland is an unincorporated community in Lancaster County in the U. S. state of Virginia.

It is adjacent to Foxwells, on a peninsula north of the outlet of the Rappahannock River into Chesapeake Bay.

References

Unincorporated communities in Virginia
Unincorporated communities in Lancaster County, Virginia
Virginia populated places on the Chesapeake Bay